The list of railway stations in Jammu and Kashmir can be divided into 3 parts:-
railway stations in Jammu Region
railway stations in Kashmir Region 
railway stations in Ladakh Region

Jammu Region

Kashmir Region

Ladakh Region
There are no railway stations yet in the Ladakh Region of Jammu and Kashmir.
For more information see
 Bhanupli–Leh line

See also

 Jammu–Baramulla line

References

External links
 Ministry of Indian Railways, Official website

Jammu and Kashmir
railway stations